Reliance Capital Limited is an Indian diversified financial services holding company promoted by Reliance Anil Dhirubhai Ambani Group. Reliance Capital, a constituent of Nifty Midcap 50 and MSCI Global Small Cap Index, is a part of the Reliance Group. It is amongst India's leading and most valuable financial services companies in the private sector. As on 31 March 2017, the net worth of the company stood at  crore, while its total assets as on the date stood at  crore. In Fortune India 500 list of 2018, Reliance Capital was ranked as the 77th largest corporation in India with 5th rank in 'Non-Banking Finance' category.

Reliance Capital has businesses in asset management, mutual funds, life insurance and general insurance, commercial finance, home finance, stock broking, wealth management services, distribution of financial products, private equity, asset reconstruction, proprietary investments and other activities in financial services. The company operates across India and has over 20 million customers and workforce of approximately 15,595 as of 1 May 2017.

Anil Ambani, promoter of Reliance Group is the Chairman of Reliance Capital, while Amitabh Jhunjhunwala is the Vice-Chairman and Anmol Ambani as the Executive Director.

The Reserve Bank of India (RBI) had on 29 November 2021 superseded the board of Reliance Capital in view of payment defaults and serious governance issues.

As of November 2022, the company is under the control of the Reserve Bank of India

History
Reliance Capital Limited was incorporated in 1986 at Ahmedabad in Gujarat as Reliance Capital & Finance Trust Limited. The name Reliance Capital came into effect on 5 January 1995.

In 2002, Reliance Capital Ltd shifted its registered office to Jamnagar in Gujarat before it finally moved to Mumbai in Maharashtra, in 2006.

In 2006, Reliance Capital Ventures Limited merged with Reliance Capital. With this merger the shareholder base of Reliance Capital rose from 0.15 million shareholders to 1.3 million.

Reliance Capital entered the capital market with a maiden public issue in 1990 and in subsequent years further tapped the capital market through rights issue and public issues. The equity shares were initially listed on the Ahmedabad Stock Exchange and the Stock Exchange Mumbai. The equity shares are listed on the Stock Exchange Mumbai and the National Stock Exchange of India.

In June 2019, auditors of PwC resigned citing that they weren't allowed to carry on their audits if Reliance Capital prevented it from exercising independent judgment in making a report to the members of the company. In a recent development, the auditors revealed that the recoverables of Rs. 7083 crore were actually inter corporate deposits of other Reliance group companies that were being diverted. On the other hand, Reliance has claimed that there has been no diversion of money; zero loans and or liquidity have been provided by any lender in the PwC audited period. Reliance Capital is confident that the report of the continuing auditor will establish that there were no irregularities.

Non-banking finance company
Reliance Capital obtained its registration as a non-banking finance company (NBFC) in December 1998. 
It has since diversified its activities in the areas of asset management, life and general insurance, commercial finance, stock broking, private equity and proprietary investments, asset reconstruction, distribution of financial products and other activities in financial services.

Credit rating
Reliance Capital has a net debt equity ratio of 1.88 as of 31 March 2017. It is one of the top rated Indian financial institutions and has the highest ratings of 'A1+’ by ICRA and CRISIL for its short term borrowing program, and 'CARE D' by CARE for its long term borrowing program.

Operations 
Reliance Capital offers a range of financial services in many business lines. The company is one of the most diversified financial services firms in India with interests expanding from asset management, insurance, commercial finance, broking, private equity to other niche financial services.

Its prominent businesses are as follows:

Reliance General Insurance

Reliance General Insurance Company Limited is an Indian insurance company, part of Reliance Capital Ltd.  The firm has a 7.3% market share in the private sector and has the largest agency channel, with over 24,500 agents. The CEO and Executive Director is Rakesh Jain.

The company has strengthened and diversified its distribution network by forging partnerships with major banks. Reliance General Insurance is an active participant in various government crop insurance schemes, including the Pradhan Mantri Fasal Bima Yojna, and has insured over 3 million farmers under this financial inclusion initiative. Reliance General Insurance (RGI) offers insurance for auto, health, home, property, travel, marine, commercial and other specialty products.

Reliance Commercial Finance

Reliance Commercial Finance is among the leading lenders in the Indian non-banking finance sector. The CEO and Executive Director of the company is Devang Mody.

The company has an operational presence of over 44 locations in India and an AUM of 16759 Cr. as in March 2017. Reliance Commercial Finance offers a wide range of products which include business expansion loans, property loans, vehicle loans, construction equipment loans, infrastructure, microfinance and agriculture loans. The company had a loan book at ₹124.36 billion (US$2.1 billion) as on 31 March 2017, with over 268,278 customers (including microfinance) across India.

Reliance Home Finance Limited

Ravindra Sudhalkar is the CEO and Executive Director of the company.

Reliance Home Finance Limited (RHF), a 100% subsidiary of Reliance Capital, provides home loans, LAP, construction finance, and affordable housing loans. The company has over 1,750 distributors serving over 33,300 customers across 90 locations, through a hub and spoke model, across the country.

The company filed for IPO in 2017 and the shares got listed on National Stock Exchange of India Limited and BSE Limited in the same year. The stock price recorded a fall of more than 95% within 2 years of its IPO.

Reliance Securities
Reliance Securities, the broking and distribution arm of Reliance Capital, is one of India's leading retail broking houses. B Gopkumar is the Chief Executive Officer and Executive Director of its broking and distribution business.

The distribution business has approximately 80 branches across India.

Reliance Asset Reconstruction
Reliance Asset Reconstruction is an asset reconstruction company, the principal sponsor/shareholder of which is Reliance Group (through Reliance Capital). The AUM as on 31 March 2017, stands at Rs. 1,829 crore (previous year: Rs. 1488 crore).

Reliance Health Insurance 
Ravi Vishwanath is the CEO and Executive Director of Reliance Health Insurance.

Reliance Health Insurance is a Standalone Health Insurance Company promoted solely by Reliance Capital It was established on 7 May 2017. The company is headquartered in Mumbai, Maharashtra and has started operations on 10 December 2018.

Major deals
In 2011, Reliance Capital sold 26% stake in its life insurance business, Reliance Life Insurance, to Nippon Life Insurance (Nissay), amongst the world's largest life insurers, with an AUM of over $600 billion. The transaction was completed at Rs. 3,082 crore for a 26 per cent stake, valuing Reliance Life Insurance at $2.6 billion.

In 2012, Nippon Life Insurance bought 26% stake in Reliance Capital Asset Management for Rs. 1,450 crore.

Reports indicate that Reliance Capital is also planning to sell a 26% stake in its general insurance business, Reliance General Insurance, at an appropriate time. India's leading financial daily Economic Times wrote, "Since Reliance General Insurance is one of the leading players with 8.4 per cent market share, the proposed stake sale is expected to generate handsome capital gains for Reliance Capital... Besides de-leveraging the balance sheet, the ongoing restructuring should also help Reliance Capital conserve capital and generate better return ratios."

Reliance Capital in July 2014 announced the merger of its global film and media services business with Prime Focus to create an entity with a combined turnover of over Rs 1,800 crore.

In July 2017, it sold its 1% share in Paytm to China's Alibaba Group for Rs 275 crore, making a profit of 2,600%.

In September 2019, it sold 21.54% stake in Reliance Nippon Life Asset Management to Nippon Life Insurance Company alongside completely exiting its entire stake in wholly owned subsidiaries Reliance Capital Trustee Co and Reliance Capital AIF Trustee Company.

See also
 Nippon Life

References

External links 
 

Financial services companies of India
Reliance Group
Financial services companies based in Mumbai
Financial services companies established in 1986
1986 establishments in Maharashtra
Indian companies established in 1986
Companies listed on the National Stock Exchange of India
Companies listed on the Bombay Stock Exchange